Heo Gyun (Hanja: , 10 December 1569 – 12 October 1618) was a Korean novelist, poet, and politician during the Joseon period. He was also known by his pennames, Gyosan (교산 蛟山) and Seongso (성소 惺所).

Life 
Heo Gyun was born into the Yangcheon Heo clan in the city of Gangneung to Heo Yeop and his second wife, Lady Kim of the Gangneung Kim clan. Heo Gyun's sister Heo Nanseolheon was a poet.
Heo's family was of the noble (yangban) class (his father had been mayor of Gangneung) and as such Heo Gyun was afforded a solid education and in 1594 passed the nation's highest civil service exam. Under the strong influence of his tutor, Yi Dal 李達, Heo Gyun became a progressive and liberal thinker who dreamed of establishing a more progressive society by eliminating  Confucian elements in the social, literary, and political realms. Heo went on to serve the government of Joseon in such positions as Minister of the Board of Punishment and State Councillor. In the course of his political career he was exiled several times for involvement in political feuds and was ultimately executed on charges of treason during the reign of Prince Gwanghae. 

Heo is often credited as the author of the famous Korean story Tale of Hong Gildong, which in many ways reflects his progressive thinking, although his authorship has been disputed.

Family 
 Great-Great-Great-Grandfather
 Heo Chu (허추, 許樞)
 Great-Great-Grandfather
 Heo Gal (허갈, 許葛)
 Great-Grandfather
 Heo Dam (허담, 許聃)
 Grandfather
 Heo Han (허한, 許澣) (? - 1532)
 Grandmother
 Lady Seong of the Changnyeong Seong clan (창녕 성씨) (? - 1557)
 Father
 Heo Yeop (허엽, 許曄) (19 December 1517 - 4 February 1580)
 Mother
 Lady Kim of the Gangneung Kim clan (정부인 강릉 김씨)
 Maternal Grandfather: Kim Gwang-cheol (김광철, 金光轍)
 Stepmother: Lady Han of the Cheongju Han clan (정부인 청주 한씨)
 Maternal step-grandfather: Han Suk-chang (한숙창, 韓叔昌) (1478 - 1537)
 Maternal step-grandmother: Lady Yi of the Jeonju Yi clan (전주 이씨)
 Siblings 
 Older half-brother: Heo Seong (허성, 許筬) (1548 - 1612)
 Sister-in-law: Lady Yi of the Jeonju Yi clan (전주 이씨)
 Half-niece: Lady Heo of the Yangcheon Heo clan (양천 허씨, 陽川 許氏); died prematurely
 Sister-in-law: Lady Nam of the Uiryeong Nam clan (의령 남씨)
 Half-Nephew: Heo Sil (허실, 許實)
 Half-Nephew: Heo Bo (허보, 許寶)
 Half-Nephew: Heo Shin (허신)
 Half-Niece: Lady Heo of the Yangcheon Heo clan (양천 허씨, 陽川 許氏)
 Nephew-in-law: Hong Yeong (홍영, 洪榮)
 Half-Niece: Princess Consort Heo of the Yangcheon Heo clan (군부인 양천 허씨, 陽川郡夫人 陽川 許氏)
 Nephew-in-law: Yi Gwang, Prince Uichang (의창군 이광, 義昌君 李珖) (1589 - 1645)
 Adoptive half-grandnephew: Yi Il, Prince Changrim (창림군 이일, 昌臨君 李佾) (1629 - 1690)
 Older half-sister: Lady Heo of the Yangcheon Heo clan (양천 허씨, 陽川 許氏)
 Brother-in-law: Park Sun-won (박순원, 朴舜元)
 Older half-sister: Lady Heo of the Yangcheon Heo clan (증정부인 양천 허씨)
 Brother-in-law: Woo Seong-jeon (우성전, 禹性傳) (1542 - 1593)
 Older brother: Heo Bong (허봉, 許篈) (1551 - 1588)
 Sister-in-law: Lady Yi of the Jeonju Yi clan (숙인 전주 이씨); daughter of Yi Woo-bin (이우빈, 李禹賓)
 Nephew: Heo Chae (허채, 許寀)
 Nephew: Heo Sang (허상)
 Niece: Lady Heo of the Yangcheon Heo clan (양천 허씨, 陽川 許氏)
 Nephew-in-law: Kim Geuk-geon (김극건, 金克健)
 Grandnephew: Kim Se-ryeom (김세렴, 金世濂)
Grandnephew: Kim Se-pil (김세필, 金世弼)
 Older sister: Heo Nanseolheon (난설헌 허씨, 蘭雪軒許氏) (1563 - 19 March 1589)
 Brother-in-law: Kim Seong-rib (김성립, 金誠立) of the Andong Kim clan (안동 김씨) (1562 - 1592)
 Nephew: Kim Hui-yun (김희윤); died prematurely
 Niece: Lady Kim of the Andong Kim clan (안동 김씨): died prematurely
 Adoptive nephew: Kim Jin (김진, 金振); son of Kim Jeong-rib (김정립, 金正立)
 Wives and their children 
 Lady Kim of the Andong Kim clan (정부인 안동 김씨) (1571 - 16 August 1592)
 Father-in-law - Kim Dae-seob (김대섭)
 Mother-in-law - Lady Sim of the Cheongseong Sim clan (청송 심씨) 
 Unnamed son (1592 - 1592); died prematurely 
 Unnamed son; died prematurely  
 Daughter - Lady Heo of the Yangcheon Heo clan (양천 허씨)
 Son-in-law - Lee Sa-seong (이사성, 李士星)
 Grandson - Lee Pil-jin (이필진, 李必進) (1610 - 1671)
 Daughter - Lady Heo of the Yangcheon Heo clan (양천 허씨)
 Lady Kim of the Seonsan Kim clan (정부인 선산 김씨)
 Father-in-law - Kim Hyo-won (김효원, 金孝元) (1542 - 1590)
 Mother-in-law - Lady Jeong of the Chogye Jeong clan (초계 정씨)
Brother-in-law - Kim Geuk-geon (김극건, 金克健)
Brother-in-law - Kim Geuk-seon (김극선, 金克銑)
Brother-in-law - Kim Geuk-ryeon (김극련, 金克鍊)
 Daughter - Royal Consort Sohun of the Yangcheon Heo clan (소훈 허씨)
 Son-in-law - Yi Jil, Deposed Crown Prince (폐세자 이질, 廢世子 李祬) (31 December 1598 - 22 July 1623)
 Son - Heo Gwing (허굉, 許宏)
 Grandson - Heo Heum (허흠, 許嶔)
 Concubine - Lady Kim (김씨)
 Concubine - Lady Song Seong-ok (송성옥, 宋成玉)
 Concubine - Lady Yi Mae-chang (이매창)
 Concubine - Lady Chu-seom (추섬, 秋蟾) or Hyeon Eung-min (현응민, 玄應旻)
 Concubine - Lady Ok-mae (옥매, 玉梅)

Works 

 Honggildongjeon (홍길동전) (attributed)
 Dongguk myeongsandong cheonjuhaegi (동국명산동천주해기 東國名山洞天註解記)
 Domundaejak (도문대작 屠門大嚼)
 Namgungdujeon (남궁두전 南宮斗傳)
 Yujaeron (유재론 遺才論)
 Seongsobu bugo (성소부부고 惺所覆?藁)
 Haksan chodam (학산초담 鶴山樵談)
 Gukjo sisan (국조시산 國朝詩刪)
 Hanjeongnok (한정록 閑情錄)
 Gyosansihwa (교산시화 蛟山詩話)
 Gosiseon (고시선 古詩選)
 Sachesungdang (사체성당 四體盛唐)
 Dangsiseon (당시선 唐詩選)
 Songohghasicho (송오가시초 宋五家詩抄)
 Myungsagashiseon (명사가시선 明四家詩選)
 Eomcheosajeon (엄처사전)
 Songoksaninjeon (손곡산인전)
 Jangsaninjeon (장산인전)
 Jangsaengjeon (장생전)
 Namgung seonsaengjeon (남궁선생전)

Gallery

In popular culture
Portrayed by Kim Joo-young in the 1986 MBC TV series The Hoechun Gate.
Portrayed by Lee Dong-shin in the 1988 MBC TV series Queen Inhyeon.
Portrayed by Kim Dong-hyun in the 1993 MBC TV series Iljimae.
Portrayed by Kim Jong-kyul in the 1995 KBS TV series West Palace.
Portrayed by Choi Jae-sung in the 2000 KBS TV series Roll of Thunder.
Portrayed by Ryu Seung-ryong in the 2012 film Masquerade and in the 2014 SBS TV series My Love from the Star.
Portrayed by Ahn Nae-sang in the 2015 MBC TV series Splendid Politics.

Site web 
 Heo Gyun 
 Heo Gyun:Navercast 
 Heo Gyun

References 

1569 births
1618 deaths
16th-century Korean poets
17th-century Korean poets
16th-century Korean novelists
17th-century Korean novelists
Heo clan of Yangcheon
Hong Gildong jeon
Joseon scholar-officials
Korean fantasy writers
Korean male poets
Korean novelists
Korean Taoists
Mythopoeic writers
People from Gangneung